John Dudley (by 1526–1580), of Stoke Newington, Middlesex, was an English politician.

He was a Member (MP) of the Parliament of England for Carlisle in March 1553 and Helston in 1563.

References

1580 deaths
People from Stoke Newington
Members of the pre-1707 English Parliament for constituencies in Cornwall
Year of birth uncertain
English MPs 1553 (Edward VI)
English MPs 1563–1567